Herbert Spindler (born 6 April 1954) is an Austrian former cyclist. He competed at the 1976 Summer Olympics and the 1980 Summer Olympics. He won the Austrian National Road Race Championships in 1976 and 1978.

References

External links
 

1954 births
Living people
Austrian male cyclists
Olympic cyclists of Austria
Cyclists at the 1976 Summer Olympics
Cyclists at the 1980 Summer Olympics
Sportspeople from Salzburg